Radoslav Harman is a Slovak mathematician working in the area of optimal design of statistical experiments. He is currently a docent at Comenius University.

Biography
In 2004, Harman obtained PhD in statistics from Comenius University, under the supervision of Andrej Pazman. He has published 30 research papers in the field of optimal design.

Bibliography

References

Academic staff of Comenius University
Comenius University alumni
Slovak mathematicians
Living people
Year of birth missing (living people)